George Clerk may refer to:

Sir George Clerk, 6th Baronet (1787–1867), British politician 
Sir George Russell Clerk (1800–1889), civil servant in British India
George Clerk (diplomat) (1874–1951), British diplomat
George C. Clerk (1931–2019), Ghanaian botanist and plant pathologist

See also
George Clerk-Maxwell (1715–1784), Scottish landowner
George Clarke (disambiguation)
George Clark (disambiguation)
Clerk (disambiguation)